Epidendrum polyanthum (gloss:  "many flowers upon a tree") is a species of orchid in the genus Epidendrum.

polyanthum
Orchids of Central America
Orchids of Belize